Emma-Louise Wilson is an Australian actress. She is best known for her role as Katie in the Logie Award and AACTA Award-winning comedy series Utopia. She also features in the ensemble for the comedy sketch show Kinne. Wilson played a minor role as Katey in the film Any Questions for Ben? (2012), where she was spotted by Rob Sitch and offered a role in Utopia. Wilson also played the role of Tenille in the wrestling zombie film From Parts Unknown: Fight Like a Girl (2015).

Wilson was born and lives in Melbourne, Australia.

Filmography

Film

Television

References

Living people
Actresses from Melbourne
21st-century Australian actresses
Australian film actresses
Australian television actresses
Year of birth missing (living people)